Warwick (  or  ) is a city in Kent County, Rhode Island, the third largest city in the state with a population of 82,823 at the 2020 census.

Warwick was founded by Samuel Gorton in 1642 and has witnessed major events in American history. It was decimated during King Philip's War (1675–1676) and was the site of the Gaspee Affair, the first act of armed resistance against the British, preceding even the Boston Tea Party, and a significant prelude to the American Revolution. Warwick was also the home of Revolutionary War General Nathanael Greene, George Washington's second-in-command, and Civil War General George S. Greene, a hero of the Battle of Gettysburg. Today, it is home to Rhode Island's main airport, T. F. Green Airport, which serves the Providence area and also functions as a reliever for Logan International Airport in Boston, Massachusetts.

Early history

Warwick was colonized by Europeans in 1642. The city was named after a town with the same name located in England. Samuel Gorton claimed that Narragansett Nation Sachem Miantonomi sold him the Shawhomett Purchase for 144 fathoms of wampum. This included the towns of Coventry and West Warwick, Rhode Island. However, the transaction was dubious from the start. Sachems Sacononoco and Pumham claimed that Miantonomi had sold the land without asking for their approval. They took their case to Boston, where they placed their lands under Massachusetts rule. In 1643, Massachusetts Bay Colony sent a militia force to Shawomett to arrest Gorton and his followers. After a tense standoff, all but three of the Gortonists surrendered to the Massachusetts forces. This event caused the other three colonies on Narragansett Bay (Providence Plantations, Portsmouth, and Newport) to unite and get a British royal charter allowing them to form the Colony of Rhode Island and Providence Plantations.

In 1648, Gorton was granted a British charter by Robert Rich, 2nd Earl of Warwick, Lord Admiral and head of the Parliamentary Commission on Plantation Affairs. Because of this, the name of the settlement was changed from Shawhomett to Warwick. Massachusetts Bay Colony continued to lay claim to the area, but it made no further effort to enforce it.

In 1772, Warwick was the scene of the first violent act against the British Crown in the Gaspee Affair. Local patriots boarded the Gaspee, a revenue cutter that enforced the Stamp Act 1765 and Townshend Acts in Narragansett Bay. It was here that the first blood was spilled in the American Revolution when Gaspee's commanding officer Lt. Dudingston was shot and seriously wounded during the struggle for the ship. The Gaspee was stripped of all cannons and arms, then burned.

During the Revolution, Warwick militiamen participated in the battles of Montreal, Quebec, Saratoga, Monmouth, and Trenton, and they were present for the British surrender at Yorktown in 1781.

Transportation

Major traversing highways include: 
  Interstate 95
  Interstate 295
  Route 37 
 T. F. Green Airport Connector Road
Interstate 95 is the major thoroughfare of Rhode Island, with the first southbound exit in Warwick at Jefferson Boulevard, and ending with the Route 117 interchange, near the Apponaug rotaries. Interstate 295 connects to the main highway at exit 27, providing direct travel to Woonsocket and Massachusetts. Smaller routes include Route 37 (Lincoln Avenue Freeway) connecting 295 to U.S. Route 1, and the Airport Connector Road.

The Rhode Island T. F. Green International Airport is the main airport serving Rhode Island, and is located in Warwick. The name was changed for T.F. Green Airport in 2021. T. F. Green Airport is a station on the Providence/Stoughton Commuter Rail Line, providing weekday service to Providence Station and Boston's South Station.

Climate

Geography

Warwick is located at  (41.7181, −71.4152).

The following villages are located in Warwick:

Demographics

Warwick is officially a part of the Providence metropolitan area, which has a population of 1,600,852 in 2010 census. As of the census of 2020, there were 82,976 people, with 35,469 households in the city. The racial makeup of the city was 90.1% White, 2.1% African American, 0.4% Native American, 3.3% Asian, 0.0% Pacific Islander, and 3.0% from two or more races. Hispanic or Latino of any race were 5.9% of the population.

As of the 2000 Census, there were 35,517 households, out of which 27.4% had children under the age of 18 living with them, 50.7% were married couples living together, 10.2% had a female householder with no husband present, and 35.3% were non-families. 29.8% of all households were made up of individuals, and 13.2% had someone living alone who was 65 years of age or older. The average household size was 2.39 and the average family size was 2.99.

In the city, the population was spread out, with 21.9% under the age of 18, 6.7% from 18 to 24, 30.1% from 25 to 44, 24.3% from 45 to 64, and 17.0% who were 65 years of age or older. The median age was 40 years. For every 100 females, there were 90.8 males. For every 100 females age 18 and over, there were 87.2 males.

The median income for a household in the city was $46,483, and the median income for a family was $56,225. Males had a median income of $39,455 versus $28,946 for females. The per capita income for the city was $23,410. About 4.2% of families and 5.9% of the population were below the poverty line, including 6.4% of those under age 18 and 7.5% of those age 65 or over.

Government

Warwick is split into three districts in the Rhode Island Senate which are currently held by Democrats Michael McCaffrey (District 29), Jeanine Calkin (District 30), and Kendra Anderson (District 31). The town is a part of Rhode Island's 2nd congressional district, which is currently represented by Democrat James Langevin. It is traditionally Democratic in presidential elections; no Republican has carried it in over three decades.

Economy
Before its dissolution, Eckerd Corporation had its headquarters in Warwick.

The ten largest employers in Warwick are Kent Memorial Hospital, Citizens Bank- Warwick Call Center, UPS, MetLife, City of Warwick, Leviton Manufacturing, Wal-Mart, Community College of Rhode Island, J.C. Penney, Kenney Manufacturing, and Inskip Automall.

Notable people

 Bill Almon, MLB player who attended Warwick Veterans Memorial High School
 Rocco Baldelli, MLB player and Minnesota Twins manager who attended Bishop Hendricken High School
 John Belluso, playwright 
 Clarence Otis Bigelow, pharmacist and banker 
 John Brown, American merchant and participant in the Gaspee Affair; Brown University is named for him
 Marnee Carpenter, actress
 Thomas Holden, American general and Rhode Island Supreme Court justice
 John Hynes, Head coach of the NHL Nashville Predators, born in Warwick
 Martha McSally, Senator from Arizona (2019–2020), born and raised in Warwick
 Walt Mossberg, personal technology journalist and editor, born and raised in Warwick who attended Pilgrim High School
 Nolan North, voice actor who attended Bishop Hendricken High School
 David Petrarca, notable director of TV, film and theatre including Game of Thrones.

 Dave Shalansky, actor, attended Toll Gate High School
 Kyle Smith, Vice president of player personnel of the Atlanta Falcons
 Chris Terreri, NHL goalie attended Pilgrim High School
 Dan Wheeler, MLB pitcher attended Pilgrim High School
 Fred Whittingham, NFL player and coach, attended Warwick Veterans Memorial High School
 James Woods, actor, attended Pilgrim High School in 1965

Education

Local public schools are operated by Warwick Public Schools. Toll Gate High School and Pilgrim High School are the two comprehensive public high schools located in Warwick. The two public middle schools are Winman Junior High School and Warwick Veterans Junior High School. Aldrich Junior High School and Gorton Junior High School closed in 2016 as part of the school consolidation project. The school department is headed by superintendent Lynn Dambruch.

Bishop Hendricken High School is an all-male college preparatory Catholic high school located in Warwick. Rocky Hill School is a Pre-K–12 co-ed secular country day school located on Warwick's isolated Potowomut peninsula. The school lists an East Greenwich address, despite being geographically included as part of the city of Warwick.

The Community College of Rhode Island Knight Campus is also located in Warwick on the former Knight Estate.

Sister cities

  Fornelli, Molise, Italy

References

External links

 
Cities in Rhode Island
Cities in Kent County, Rhode Island
Populated places established in 1642
Providence metropolitan area
Populated coastal places in Rhode Island
1642 establishments in Rhode Island